A euphemism is an innocuous word or expression used in place of one that is deemed offensive or suggests something unpleasant. Some euphemisms are intended to amuse, while others use bland, inoffensive terms for concepts that the user wishes to downplay. Euphemisms may be used to mask profanity or refer to topics some consider taboo such as disability, sex, excretion, or death in a polite way.

Etymology
Eupheme is a reference to the female Greek spirit of words of praise and positivity, etc. The term euphemism itself was used as a euphemism by the ancient Greeks; with the meaning "to keep a holy silence" (speaking well by not speaking at all).<ref>{{cite dictionary|url=http://www.etymonline.com/index.php?term=euphemism&allowed_in_frame=0|title=Euphemism" Etymology|dictionary=Online Etymology Dictionary|access-date=10 June 2015|archive-date=20 March 2015|archive-url=https://web.archive.org/web/20150320002713/http://etymonline.com/index.php?term=euphemism&allowed_in_frame=0|url-status=live}}</ref>

Purpose
Avoidance
Reasons for using euphemisms vary by context and intent. Commonly, euphemisms are used to avoid directly addressing subjects that might be deemed negative or embarrassing, e.g. death, sex, excretory bodily functions. They may be created for innocent, well-intentioned purposes or nefariously and cynically, intentionally to deceive and confuse.

Mitigation
Euphemisms are also used to mitigate, soften or downplay the gravity of large-scale injustices, war crimes, or other events that warrant a pattern of avoidance in official statements or documents. For instance, one reason for the comparative scarcity of written evidence documenting the exterminations at Auschwitz, relative to their sheer number, is "directives for the extermination process obscured in bureaucratic euphemisms".

Euphemisms are sometimes used to lessen the opposition to a political move. For example, according to linguist Ghil'ad Zuckermann, Israeli Prime Minister Benjamin Netanyahu used the neutral Hebrew lexical item פעימות peimót ("beatings (of the heart)"), rather than נסיגה nesigá ("withdrawal"), to refer to the stages in the Israeli withdrawal from the West Bank (see Wye River Memorandum), in order to lessen the opposition of right-wing Israelis to such a move. The lexical item פעימות peimót, which literally means "beatings (of the heart)" is thus a euphemism for "withdrawal".

Rhetoric
Euphemism may be used as a rhetorical strategy, in which case its goal is to change the valence of a description.

Controversial use
The act of labeling a term as a euphemism can in itself be controversial, as in the following two examples:
 Affirmative action, meaning a preference for minorities or the historically disadvantaged, usually in employment or academic admissions. This term is sometimes said to be a euphemism for reverse discrimination, or, in the UK, positive discrimination, which suggests an intentional bias that might be legally prohibited, or otherwise unpalatable.
 Enhanced interrogation is a euphemism for torture. For example, columnist David Brooks called the use of this term for practices at Abu Ghraib, Guantánamo, and elsewhere an effort to "dull the moral sensibility".

Formation methods
Phonetic modification

Phonetic euphemism is used to replace profanities and blasphemies, diminishing their intensity. Modifications include:
 Shortening or "clipping" the term, such as Jeez (Jesus) and what the— ("what the hell").
 Mispronunciations, such as oh my gosh ("oh my God"), frickin ("fucking"), darn ("damn") or oh shoot ("oh shit"). This is also referred to as a minced oath.
 Using acronyms as replacements, such as SOB ("son of a bitch"). Sometimes, the word "word" or "bomb" is added after it, such as F-word ("fuck"), etc. Also, the letter can be phonetically respelled.

Pronunciation

To alter the pronunciation or spelling of a taboo word (such as a swear word) to form a euphemism is known as taboo deformation, or a minced oath. Feck is a minced oath originating in Hiberno-English and popularised outside of Ireland by the British sitcom Father Ted. Some examples of Cockney rhyming slang may serve the same purpose: to call a person a berk sounds less offensive than to call a person a cunt, though berk is short for Berkeley Hunt, which rhymes with cunt.

Understatement
Euphemisms formed from understatements include: asleep for dead and drinking for consuming alcohol. "Tired and emotional" is a notorious British euphemism for "drunk", one of many recurring jokes popularised by the satirical magazine Private Eye; it has been used by MPs to avoid unparliamentary language.

Substitution

Pleasant, positive, worthy, neutral, or nondescript terms are often substituted for explicit or unpleasant ones, with many substituted terms deliberately coined by sociopolitical movements, marketing, public relations, or advertising initiatives, including:
"meat packing company" for "slaughter-house" (avoids entirely the subject of killing); "natural issue" or "love child" for "bastard"; "let go" for "fired", etc.

Over time, it becomes socially unacceptable to use the latter word, as one is effectively downgrading the matter concerned to its former lower status, and the euphemism becomes dominant, due to a wish not to offend; see euphemism treadmill.

Metaphor
 Metaphors (beat the meat, choke the chicken, or jerkin' the gherkin for masturbation; take a dump and take a leak for defecation and urination, respectively)
 Comparisons (buns for buttocks, weed for cannabis)
 Metonymy (men's room for "men's toilet")

Slang

The use of a term with a softer connotation, though it shares the same meaning. For instance, screwed up is a euphemism for fucked up; hook-up and laid are euphemisms for sexual intercourse.

Foreign words
Expressions or words from a foreign language may be imported for use as euphemism. For example, the French word enceinte was sometimes used instead of the English word pregnant; abattoir for "slaughter-house", although in French the word retains its explicit violent meaning "a place for beating down", conveniently lost on non-French speakers. "Entrepreneur" for "business-man", adds glamour; "douche" (French: shower) for vaginal irrigation device; "bidet" (French: little pony) for "vessel for intimate ablutions". Ironically, although in English physical "handicaps" are almost always described with euphemism, in French the English word "handicap" is used as a euphemism for their problematic words "infirmité" or "invalidité".

Periphrasis/circumlocution
Periphrasis, or circumlocution, is one of the most common: to "speak around" a given word, implying it without saying it. Over time, circumlocutions become recognized as established euphemisms for particular words or ideas.

Doublespeak

Bureaucracies frequently spawn euphemisms intentionally, as doublespeak expressions. For example, in the past, the US military used the term "sunshine units" for contamination by radioactive isotopes. Into the present, the United States Central Intelligence Agency refers to systematic torture as "enhanced interrogation techniques". An effective death sentence in the Soviet Union during the Great Purge often used the clause "imprisonment without right to correspondence": the person sentenced would be shot soon after conviction. As early as 1939, Nazi official Reinhard Heydrich used the term Sonderbehandlung ("special treatment") to mean summary execution of persons viewed as "disciplinary problems" by the Nazis even before commencing the systematic extermination of the Jews. Heinrich Himmler, aware that the word had come to be known to mean murder, replaced that euphemism with one in which Jews would be "guided" (to their deaths) through the slave-labor and extermination camps after having been "evacuated" to their doom. Such was part of the formulation of Endlösung der Judenfrage (the "Final Solution to the Jewish Question"), which became known to the outside world during the Nuremberg Trials.

  Lifespan 

Frequently, over time, euphemisms themselves become taboo words, through the linguistic process of semantic change known as pejoration, which University of Oregon linguist Sharon Henderson Taylor dubbed the "euphemism cycle" in 1974, also frequently referred to as the "euphemism treadmill". For instance, the act of human defecation is possibly the most needy candidate for a euphemism in all eras. Toilet is an 18th-century euphemism, replacing the older euphemism house-of-office, which in turn replaced the even older euphemisms privy-house and bog-house. In the 20th century, where the old euphemisms lavatory (a place where one washes) or toilet (a place where one dresses) had grown from widespread usage (e.g., in the United States) to being synonymous with the crude act they sought to deflect, they were sometimes replaced with bathroom (a place where one bathes), washroom (a place where one washes), or restroom (a place where one rests) or even by the extreme form powder room (a place where one applies facial cosmetics). The form water closet, which in turn became euphemised to W.C., is a less deflective form.

Another example in American English is the replacement of "colored people" with "Negro" (euphemism by foreign language), which itself came to be replaced by either "African American" or "Black".

Venereal disease, which associated shameful bacterial infection with a seemingly worthy ailment emanating from Venus the goddess of love, soon lost its deflective force in the post-classical education era, as "VD", which was replaced by the three-letter initialism "STD" (sexually transmitted disease); later, "STD" was replaced by "STI" (sexually transmitted infection).

The word shit appears to have originally been a euphemism for defecation in Pre-Germanic, as the Proto-Indo-European root *, from which it was derived, meant 'to cut off'.

Mentally disabled people were originally defined with words such as "morons" or "imbeciles", which then became commonly used insults. The medical diagnosis was changed to "mentally retarded", which morphed into a pejorative against those with mental disabilities. To avoid the negative connotations of their diagnoses, students who need accommodations because of such conditions are often labeled as "special needs" instead, although the word "special" has begun to crop up as a schoolyard insult. As of August 2013, the Social Security Administration replaced the term "mental retardation" with "intellectual disability". Since 2012, that change in terminology has been adopted by the National Institutes of Health and the medical industry at large. There are numerous disability-related euphemisms that have negative connotations.

See also

 Call a spade a spade
 Code word (figure of speech)
 Dead Parrot sketch
 Distinction without a difference
 Dog whistle (politics)
 Double entendre
 Dysphemism
 Emotive conjugation
 Expurgation (often called bowdlerization, after Thomas Bowdler)
 Framing (social sciences)
 Minced oath
 Minimisation
 Persuasive definition
 Polite fiction
 Political correctness
 Political euphemism
 Puns
 Sexual slang
 Spin (propaganda)
 Statistext
 Word play
 Word taboo

References

Further reading
 Keith, Allan; Burridge, Kate. Euphemism & Dysphemism: Language Used as Shield and Weapon, Oxford University Press, 1991. .
 Benveniste, Émile, "Euphémismes anciens and modernes", in: Problèmes de linguistique générale, vol. 1, pp. 308–314. [originally published in: Die Sprache, I (1949), pp. 116–122].
 
 
 Fussell, Paul: Class: A Guide Through The American Status System, Touchstone – Simon & Schuster Inc., 1983. .
 R.W.Holder: How Not to Say What You Mean: A Dictionary of Euphemisms, Oxford University Press, 2003. .
 
 Maledicta: The International Journal of Verbal Aggression (ISSN US).
 McGlone, M. S., Beck, G., & Pfiester, R. A. (2006). "Contamination and camouflage in euphemisms". Communication Monographs, 73, 261–282.
 
 
 Heidepeter, Philipp; Reutner, Ursula. "When Humour Questions Taboo: A Typology of Twisted Euphemism Use", in: Pragmatics & Cognition'' 28/1, 138–166. .

External links
 

?
Censorship
Connotation
Figures of speech
Linguistic controversies
Propaganda techniques
Self-censorship
Taboo